Ron Obvious (born Ron Obvious Vermeulen) is a New Zealand born - studio designer, acoustic consultant, recording engineer and producer.

After completing an electronics degree in Toronto, He started working in the recording industry, September 1976 at Little Mountain Sound Studios in Vancouver. Working as a technical assistant to John Vrtacic, while also working in the dubbing room and assisting on recording sessions. In the following years he was the engineer on many jingles for [Griffiths, Gibson, Ramsay Productions] and assisted on various movie soundtracks.

In the evening hours, Obvious along with Bob Rock, Mike Fraser and Pat Glover, started recording the early new wave/punk bands in Vancouver around 1977. These included Tim Ray A/V, Pointed Sticks, Magic Dragon, D.O.A., The Subhumans, Bob Coulter, Go Four 3, Popular Front, and UJ3RK5. He also recorded the first albums by Brandon Wolf (Barney Bentall) and Spirit of the West. After assisting on the 1984 Loverboy album, Lovin' Every Minute of It, on the newly installed SSL 4048 E in Studio B, he made the move to a full-time technical future.

Upon leaving LMS in April 1991, he has gone on to design and install studios for Bryan Adams - 'The Warehouse Studio', Jim Vallance - 'Armoury Studios', 'Silverside Sound' in Cobble Hill, Brian Howes (private), Devin Townsend (private), k.d. lang (private), Bob Rock (private), Colin James (private), Mutt Lange (private) and Garth Richardson - 'The Farm Studio'. Obvious has also completed the acoustic and technical design for a number of recording schools in British Columbia, Canada.

After 12 years as technical director of The Warehouse Studio, he retired from the recording industry in August 2003, and moved to Gimli Manitoba, where he owned and operated an art gallery with his wife, "Mermaids Kiss Gallery".  During his time in Manitoba he designed his own mobile recording studio, Dragonfly Mobile Recording. In 2015, he moved to the Comox valley on Vancouver Island, where he finalised the installation of Summit Recording Solutions and is the technical director & engineer at the facility.

On Vancouver Island, Obvious has continued his acoustic consulting business, including major P/A and acoustical upgrades to, The Fanny Bay Hall, The Rainbow Room in Port Alberni, Parksville Pavilion, Knox United Church in Parksville, St. Andrew's United Church – Nanaimo, St Peter's Roman Catholic Church in Nanaimo and The Neighbourhood Church in Nanaimo.

More recent engineering/co-production projects have been - two EP's by The Paps, albums by Mise en Scene, Little House (December 2012) and Moon Tan (September 2013).  On Vancouver Island - Butts Giraud (two albums), Naden Band of Maritime Forces Pacific (two albums),  Big Pacific (two albums) and Cheryl D (three albums).

Ron also now films & edits videos, for some of his recording clients. Dragonfly Mobile Recording - Videos

At the 2013 Vancouver Music Industry Awards, Obvious was awarded the John Vrtacic Memorial Award for his many years of technical contributions to the studio industry.

He is a longtime friend of Katie Sketch, lead vocalist for The Organ.

References

External links

Canadian record producers
Living people
People from Levin, New Zealand
Year of birth missing (living people)